Acidicapsa ferrireducens is a species of bacterium originally isolated from metal-rich acidic waters.

References

External links
Type strain of Acidicapsa ferrireducens at BacDive -  the Bacterial Diversity Metadatabase

Acidobacteriota